Leo August Pochhammer (25 August 1841, Stendal – 24 March 1920, Kiel) was a Prussian mathematician who was educated in Berlin, obtaining his Ph.D. in 1863 under Ernst Kummer. He became a lecturer in 1874, then professor of mathematics at the Christian-Albrechts-Universität of Kiel (1877–1919), where he was appointed Rektor (commissioner of education) in 1893.  He is known for his work on special functions and introduced the Pochhammer symbol, now generally used for expressing hypergeometric functions in a compact notation.

See also
Pochhammer symbol
Generalized Pochhammer symbol
q-Pochhammer symbol
Pochhammer contour
Falling and rising factorials

External links
 
Eric W. Weisstein's world of science

1841 births
1920 deaths
19th-century German mathematicians
People from the Province of Saxony
People from Stendal
20th-century German mathematicians